Award Supernova: Loves Best is the second greatest hits album by M-Flo. Featured artists include Crystal Kay, BoA, Namie Amuro and Emyli. Despite the band's claim that the previous album, Cosmicolor would be the last album in the "loves" series, a brand new song called "Love Comes and Goes" featuring Emi Hinouchi, Ryohei, Emyli, Yoshika and Lisa (the "M-Flo Family") was recorded and included on the album.

The album appeared at number one on the ORICON Album Chart Daily Ranking on the first day of its release.

CD track listing 
The Beginning
Loves Comes and Goes [M-Flo Loves Emi Hinouchi, Ryohei, Emyli, Lisa and Yoshika]
Miss You [M-Flo Loves Melody. and Ryohei]
Lotta Love [M-Flo Loves Minmi]
Chapter 5
Loop in My Heart [M-Flo Loves Emyli and Yoshika]
Cosmic Night Run [M-Flo Loves Maki Nomiya and Crazy Ken Band]
Summer Time Love [M-Flo Loves Emi Hinouchi and Ryohei]
Chapter 9
Hey! [M-Flo Loves Akiko Wada]
The Love Bug [M-Flo Loves BoA]
Let Go [M-Flo Loves Yoshika]
Ping
Tripod Baby [M-Flo Loves Lisa]
Luvotomy [M-Flo Loves Namie Amuro]
Love Song [M-Flo Loves Bonnie Pink]
∞
Reeewind! [M-Flo Loves Crystal Kay]
The Rest Is History...

M-Flo albums
2008 greatest hits albums
Avex Group compilation albums